Douhou Sey Djidja Pierre (born 21 December 1987) is an Ivorian professional footballer who plays as an attacking midfielder for DSK Shivajians in the Indian I-League.

Career

Early career
Born in Abidjan, Douhou started his career at the JMG Academy which was founded by former France international Jean-Marc Guillou. While at the academy, Douhou played with future Ivorian internationals, such as Emmanuel Eboué and Salomon Kalou. He then went off to Thailand and Vietnam to train at those branches of the JMG Academy, where he then went on to play for True Sport Arsenal CF in Thailand.

Douhou's professional career began in 2007, when he signed for Hoàng Anh Gia Lai of the V.League 1, where he stayed for six months before signing for Mahindra United in the I-League of India.

Pune
In 2009, Douhou signed for Pune in the I-League. After playing for the club in the 2009–10 season, Douhou left football for a season. He returned to the club on 13 September 2011. At the end of the 2011–12 I-League season, Douhou was voted "Pune FC Player of The Year".

Salgaocar
On 9 May 2014, Douhou signed for Salgaocar, after spending five years with Pune.

Honours

Mahindra United
 Durand Cup: 2008

Individual
 Pune FC Player of The Year: 2011–12

References

External links 
 Pune Football Club Profile.

1987 births
Living people
Footballers from Abidjan
Ivorian footballers
Mahindra United FC players
Pune FC players
Salgaocar FC players
Association football midfielders
I-League players
Expatriate footballers in Vietnam
Ivorian expatriate sportspeople in Vietnam
Expatriate footballers in India